Nuevos Senderos ("New Paths") is the fourth studio album released by Puerto Rican singer Olga Tañón on April 16, 1996. The album marks a musical departure from her merengue recordings and instead focuses on pop ballads. The songs were composed and produced by Mexican singer-songwriter Marco Antonio Solís, except for "Cuestión de Suerte", which was written by Jesus Monarrez. It was nominated at the 9th Lo Nuestro Awards in 1997 for "Pop Album of the Year".

Track listing

Charts

Weekly charts

Year-end charts

Certifications

See also
 Olga Tañón discography

References

1996 albums
Olga Tañón albums
Spanish-language albums
Warner Music Latina albums
Albums produced by Marco Antonio Solís